William Burnham Woods (August 3, 1824 – May 14, 1887) was an American attorney and jurist who served as a United States circuit judge and an associate justice of the United States Supreme Court as well as an Ohio politician and soldier in the Civil War.

Early life and education
Woods was born on August 3, 1824, in Newark, Ohio. He was the older brother of Charles R. Woods, who also became a general in the Civil War. He attended college at Western Reserve University (now Case Western Reserve University) in Hudson, Ohio, before transferring to Yale University, from which he received an Artium Baccalaureus in 1845 with honors.

Career
After graduating he returned to Newark and read law by clerking for S. D. King, a prominent local lawyer. Woods was admitted to the bar in 1847. He entered the firm of his mentor, King, and became his partner. He practiced law with King in Newark, from 1847 to 1862.

Woods, a loyal Democrat, was elected Mayor of Newark in 1856. He was next elected to the Ohio General Assembly in 1858, and was selected soon after as Speaker of the House. He also served as Minority Leader.

Military service
Although Woods opposed the Civil War, because he opposed slavery, he came to accept a Union victory as a necessity. In 1862 he left the Ohio state house to join the Union Army. He was commissioned as lieutenant colonel of the 76th Ohio Infantry, which served in the Western Theater. He fought at the battles of Shiloh and Vicksburg, and was breveted brigadier general.

Woods commanded his regiment under William T. Sherman during the Atlanta Campaign and Sherman's March to the Sea. During the Carolinas Campaign, he fought with distinction at the Battle of Bentonville, where he commanded a brigade. He was appointed a brevet major general and was promoted to full Brigadier General in early 1865. He left the Army in February 1866.

Settlement in the South
He decided to settle in the South, living for a year in Mobile, Alabama, where he reopened a law practice, before moving his practice to Montgomery. There he bought property and cultivated cotton, hiring free African-American workers, likely as sharecroppers. He served as a Chancellor for the Middle Chancery Division of Alabama in Montgomery from 1868 to 1869.

Federal judicial service

Circuit Court service
Woods was appointed as a United States Circuit Judge for the United States Circuit Court for the Fifth Circuit. Woods was nominated by President Ulysses S. Grant on December 8, 1869, to a new seat, created by 16 Stat. 44. He was confirmed by the United States Senate on December 22, 1869, and received commission the same day. He was appointed to the United States Supreme Court, and resigned from the circuit court on December 23, 1880.

In United States v. Hall, 26 F. Cas. 79 (C.C.S.D. Ala. 1871), Judge Woods upheld the constitutionality of the 1870 Enforcement Act under the authority of the Fourteenth Amendment.  He held that Congress could enact legislation enforcing the “fundamental rights” of the Bill of Rights against state action and inaction. This meant Congress could enact legislation criminalizing violations of these rights by private individuals, at least in cases of state inaction.

The Slaughter-House Cases, which "tested the issue of the reach and breadth of the 14th Amendment", were the most important cases that Woods adjudicated in the lower courts. He found that a state act that created a monopoly in the slaughterhouse business violated the Privileges and Immunities Clause of the new 14th Amendment and "therefore was void". Three years later, a majority of the Supreme Court reversed his decision in the Slaughter-House Cases.

Supreme Court service
Woods was nominated by President Rutherford B. Hayes on December 15, 1880 to be an associate justice of the Supreme Court of the United States, to a seat vacated by William Strong. He was confirmed by the United States Senate, by a vote of 39 to 8, on December 21, 1880, and took the oath of office on January 5, 1881.

Woods was the first person to be named to the Supreme Court from a former Confederate state since 1853. But he was known as a Northerner, Union veteran, and Republican Party member, so was acceptable to the U.S. Senate's Republican majority.

Woods is not considered to have been a major contributor to the Court. He served six years on the bench, until his death in Washington, D.C. on May 14, 1887.

Legacy and honors
During World War II the Liberty ship , built in Brunswick, Georgia, was named in his honor.

See also

 List of American Civil War generals (Union)
 Slaughter-House Cases
 List of justices of the Supreme Court of the United States

Notes

References
 

|-

1824 births
1887 deaths
19th-century American judges
Alabama lawyers
Judges of the United States circuit courts
Ohio Democrats
Ohio Republicans
Ohio lawyers
People from Newark, Ohio
People of Ohio in the American Civil War
Speakers of the Ohio House of Representatives
Union Army generals
United States federal judges appointed by Rutherford B. Hayes
United States federal judges appointed by Ulysses S. Grant
Justices of the Supreme Court of the United States
United States federal judges admitted to the practice of law by reading law
Alabama Republicans